Kaladi Madlay was the head of a portion of the Huwan region in the early 1900s decade as well as the highest ranked avowed Ogaden within the Darawiish in the early years of this decade until his purported desertion in 1903. He was succeeded as leader of the Huwan region by Hamed Sultan.

Position
The Sayid had personally disavowed himself of wordly leisures and his tribal lineage which was Ogaden in the aftermath of the Gurdumi incident where the Ogaden turned against the Sayid. He also did as such in a summoning letter to Somali clans:

As such, this makes Kaladi Madlay the most senior ranked avowed Ogaden in the Darawiish. A British war report in 1903 stated that Kaladi Madlay was the head of the Ogaden tribe:

Role
A March 1903 telegram from the British Aden colony stated that most of the Sayid's followers were of the Dhulbahante tribe, that Madlay commanded the Darawiish cavalry, and that Madlay may have opted to abandon the Darawiish prior to the 1903 Agaarweyne battle between the European colonizers and Darawiish which would have resulted in his fellow Ogaden deserting too.

The telegram also states that the British downplayed the cost of the anti-Darawiish expedition and that the British supplies came via Hobyo and Berbera. The subsequent Agaarweyne battle resulted in a decisive victory for the Darawiish with the entire British force as well as their African and Asian levies being destroyed.

References

20th-century Ethiopian people
Year of birth unknown
Year of death unknown